Dede Sulaiman (born 3 March 1986) is an Indonesian professional footballer who plays as a goalkeeper.

Honours

Club
Persipura Jayapura
 Indonesia Soccer Championship A: 2016

Individual
 Liga 1 Team of the Season: 2019 (Substitutes)

References

External links
 
 Dede Sulaiman at Liga Indonesia

Indonesian footballers
Living people
1986 births
Sportspeople from Jakarta
PSDS Deli Serdang players
Sriwijaya F.C. players
PSPS Pekanbaru players
Arema F.C. players
Persibo Bojonegoro players
Persipura Jayapura players
Persita Tangerang players
Indonesian Premier Division players
Liga 1 (Indonesia) players
Indonesian Premier League players
Association football goalkeepers